Daniel Myrick (born September 3, 1963) is an American film director, most famous for horror films, especially for co-directing and writing the 1999 psychological horror The Blair Witch Project with Eduardo Sánchez. They won the Independent Spirit John Cassavetes Award for this film.

Life and career
Myrick was born in Sarasota, Florida. He graduated from University of Central Florida School of Film in 1994.

Along with collaborating with future Blair Witch cohorts Eduardo Sánchez and Gregg Hale on a trilogy of short films, Myrick supported himself by working as an editor and cinematographer on a number of Florida-based music videos and commercials. After he wrote and directed the promo for the Florida Film Festival in 1997, Myrick's work caught the eye of independent film guru John Pierson, helping to set the stage for the eventual 1999 debut of Myrick and Sanchez's first feature as co-writers and directors.

In 2006, he co-founded Raw Feed, a direct to DVD division of Warner Home Video that specializes in horror films, with The X-Files executive producer John Shiban and 24 executive producer Tony Krantz.

Filmography
Feature films
 The Blair Witch Project (1999)
 Solstice (2007)
 Believers (2007)
 The Objective (2008)
 Skyman (2019)

Television films
 Under the Bed (2017)

Short films
 Curse of the Blair Witch (1999)
 Sticks and Stones: Investigating the Blair Witch (1999)
 Black Veil (2021)

Web series
 The Strand (2006)

Television episodes
 Split Screen (1997-2000)

References

External links

1963 births
Living people
20th-century American screenwriters
People from Sarasota, Florida
Horror film directors
Independent Spirit Award winners
University of Central Florida alumni
Film directors from Florida
Screenwriters from Florida